This is a list of published works of American author, Robert T. Jeschonek.

Nonfiction
 Long Live Glosser's, Pie Press (2014),  
 Penn Traffic Forever, Pie Press (2015),  
 The Glory of Gable's, Pie Press (2016),   
 Richland Mall Rules, Pie Press (2017),  
 Authors and Interns: How to Boost Your Publishing Business and Pay It Forward with Student Helpers, Pie Press (2020),

Glosser Bros. Holidays Series - Johnstown, Pennsylvania fiction
 Christmas at Glosser's, Pie Press (2013).  
 Easter at Glosser's, Pie Press (2015). 
 Halloween at Glosser's, Pie Press (2015). 
 A Glosser's Christmas Love Story, Pie Press (2016). 
 Valentine's Day at Glosser's, Pie Press (2019). 
 Thanksgiving at Glosser's, Pie Press (2019). 
 Fourth of July at Glosser's, Pie Press (2020). 
 Old-Fashioned Bargain Days at Glosser's, Pie Press (2021). 
 Glosser Bros. Holiday Tales, Pie Press (2022).

Novels
 Dolphin Knight, Pie Press (2010). 
 My Favorite Band Does Not Exist, Clarion Books (2011).  
 Bloodliner, Pie Press (2011). 
 Day 9, Pie Press (2011). 
 Earthshaker, Pie Press (2011).  
 Dick by Law, Pie Press (2012). 
 The Masked Family, Pie Press (2012).  
 Battlenaut Crucible, Pie Press (2012). 
 Tannhäuser: Rising Sun, Falling Shadows, Fantasy Flight Games (2012).  
 Death by Polka, Pie Press (2012). 
 A Pinstriped Finger's My Only Friend, Pie Press (2013).  
 Unbullied, Pie Press (2014). 
 Deathlands: Child of Slaughter, (as James Axler) Gold Eagle (2015). 
 Starbarian Saga Book One: Horde's Challenge, Pie Press (2019). 
 Starbarian Saga Book Two: Horde's Power, Pie Press (2020). 
 Gaia Files Book One: Dead to the World, (as R.J. Sierra) Aethon Books (2021)
 Gaia Files Book Two: World of Trouble, (as R.J. Sierra) Aethon Books (2021)
 Gaia Files Book Three: Weight of the World, (as R.J. Sierra) Aethon Books (2021)
 Gaia Files Book Four: World on Fire, (as R.J. Sierra) Aethon Books (2021)
 Gray Lady Rising, (with Annie Reed) Blastoff Books (2022)

Audio drama
 Deathlands 124: Child of Slaughter, (as James Axler) GraphicAudio (2016).
 Deathlands 132: Feeding Frenzy, (as James Axler) GraphicAudio (2018).

Short fiction collections
 Mad Scientist Meets Cannibal, PS Publishing (2008).  
 In a Green Dress, Surrounded by Exploding Clowns and Other Stories, Pie Press (2018). 
 Blastoff!, Pie Press (2019).
 In the Empire of Underpants and Other Stories, Pie Press (2020).
 Cosmic Conflicts, Blastoff Books (2022).
 100th Power Volume 1, Blastoff Books (2023).
 100th Power Volume 2, Blastoff Books (2023).
 100th Power Volume 3, Blastoff Books (2023).

Short fiction
 "A Wall of Lisas" in Backroads (1983). 
 "Wave a White Flag" in Backroads (1986). 
 "Vincent's Secret Students" in Abyss & Apex (2004). 
 "The Duck Lover" in Loyalhanna Review (2004). 
 "Drifters" in Sciencefictionfantasyhorror.com (2005). 
 "Fear of Rain" in Postscripts 8 (2006).
 "Zinzi-zinzi-zinzic" in Darker Matter 3 (2007). 
 "The Greatest Serial Killer in the Universe" in Postscripts 12 (2007). 
 "Snakeskin" in Postscripts 13 (2007). 
 "Why the Cop with a Rose for a Head Wears a Rose-Head Mask" in Helix Speculative Fiction Quarterly 8 (2008). 
 "Acirema the Rellik" in Future Americas, DAW Books (2008).
 "Fear of Rain" in ESLI (Russia) (2008). 
 "The Wish of a Wish" in Crime Spells, DAW Books (2009). 
 "The Love Quest of Smidgen the Snack Cake" in Space and Time 108 (2009).
 "Forced Retirement" in A Thousand Faces, The Quarterly Journal of Superhuman Fiction 9 (2009).
 "Ballad of the Groupie Everlasting" in The Trouble With Heroes, DAW Books (2009).
 "Snowman's Chance in Hell" in Postscripts 20/21, Edison's Frankenstein (2010).
 "One Awake in All the World" in Destination Future, Hadley Rille Books (2010).
 "Shipwreck in the Sky" in Captain Midnight Chronicles, Moonstone (2010).
 "Crimes in the Key of Murder" in Pulp Empire Volume 3 (2010).
 "Flight of the Black Coach" in Story Portals (2011).
 "The Secret of the Ultimate Male Enhancement" in Space and Time 115 (2011).
 "Warning! Do Not Read This Story!" in Postscripts 26/27, Unfit for Eden (2012).
 "Tijuana, Massachusetts" in Mirror Shards Volume 2 (2012).
 "Playing Doctor" in Indian SF (2013).
 "The Spinach Can's Son" in Galaxy's Edge Issue 1 (2013).
 "Chariots of the Godless" in ReDeus: Native Lands (2013).
 "Time, Expressed as an Entrée" in Fiction River: Time Streams (2013).
 "In A Green Dress, Surrounded By Exploding Clowns" in Galaxy's Edge Issue 7 (2014).
 "Stella by Starlight" w/Mike Resnick in Paradox: Stories Inspired by the Fermi Paradox (2014).
 "The Spinach Can's Son" in The Best of Galaxy's Edge 2013–2014 (2014).
 "A Little Song, A Little Dance, A Little Apocalypse Down Your Pants" in Galaxy's Edge Issue 12 (2015).
 "The Messiah Business" in Fiction River: Risk Takers (2015) (Honorable Mention, Year's Best Crime & Mystery Stories (2016).
 "The Spinach Can's Son" in Galaxy's Edge Special Issue (August 2015).
 "In All Your Sparkling Raiment Soar" in Postscripts 34/35, Breakout (2015).
 "The Little Robot's Bedtime Prayer" in Galaxy's Edge Issue 18 (2016).
 "As If My Every Word Has Turned To Glass" in Pulp Literature Issue 11 (Summer 2016).
 "Time, Expressed as an Entrée" in Fiction River Presents: The Unexpected (2016).
 "The First Hollywood Cowboy of the Bropocalypse" in Alephi.com (2017).
 "In a Green Dress, Surrounded by Exploding Clowns" in Words (March 2017).
 "In the Empire of Underpants" in Fiction River: No Humans Allowed (2017).
 "Count the Ways" in Heart's Kiss Issue 1 (2017).
 "The Greatest Serial Killer in the Universe" in At The Helm: Volume 2: A Sci-Fi Bridge Anthology (2017).
 "A Little Song, A Little Dance, A Little Apocalypse Down Your Pants" in Feast of Laughter Issue 4 (2017).
 "Playing Doctor" in At The Helm: Volume 3: A Sci-Fi Bridge Anthology (2017).
 "Underfoot" in Battletech: Legacy (2017).
 "Lost Luggage" in Heart's Kiss Issue 4 (2017).
 "The Breakout Story of Galaxy's Edge Issue Ten Million" in Galaxy's Edge Issue 28 (2017).
 "Piggyback" in Fiction River: Feel the Fear (2017).
 "A Spice Most Demanding" in Uncollected Anthology: Warlocks (2017).
 "Not-So-Fortunate Son" in Sins of the Father (2017).
 "The Sword That Spoke" in In the Lair: Volume 1: A Fantasy Bridge Anthology (2017).
 "Voyage of the Dog-Propelled Starship" in The Expanding Universe 3 (2017).
 "A Little Song, A Little Dance, A Little Apocalypse Down Your Pants" in Pulphouse Issue 0 (2017).
 "The Darks of Their Eyes" in Fiction River: Justice (2018).
 "Dirty Dreams of a Dishwasher" in Tales from the Canyons of the Damned Issue 22 (2018).
 "In the Empire of Underpants" in Pulphouse Issue 1 (2018). 
 "The Stars So Black, The Space So White" in Galaxy's Edge Issue 31 (2018).
 "Identical" in Pulphouse Issue 2 (2018).
 "The Dancing Dead" in Modern Magic: An Urban Fantasy Anthology (2018).
 "Where No Furry Has Gone Before" in Boundary Shock Quarterly Issue 1 (2018).
 "Granted" in Fiction River: Wishes (2018).
 "Blackbeard's Aliens" in At The Helm: Volume 4: A Sci-Fi Bridge Anthology (2018).
 "Driverless" in Blood and Gasoline (2018).
 "Time Travel Among the Tasmanian Tigers of West Virginia" in Future Visions Volume 1 (2018).
 "Every Cloud Has A Silicon Lining" in Boundary Shock Quarterly Issue 2 (2018).
 "Robbing Them Double-Blind" in Boundary Shock Quarterly Issue 3 (2018).
 "Tempus Fugitive" in Timeshift: Tales of Time (2018).
 "The Merchant of Elves" in Uncollected Anthology: Fairy Tales (2018).
 "Time, Expressed as an Entrée" in Pulphouse Issue 3 (2018).
 "Death-Blind" in Fiction River: Pulse Pounders: Countdown (2018).
 "The Men Without Heads Join a Health Club" in Boundary Shock Quarterly Issue 4 (2018).
 "Trick or Treat in Hell" in Tales from the Canyons of the Damned Issue 28 (2018).
 "And The Unicorn You Rode In On" in Uncollected Anthology: Urban Western (2018).
 "Bigger Than the Monkey" in Pulphouse Issue 4 (2018).
 "Dreaming of a Carboniferous Christmas" in Tales from the Canyons of the Damned Issue 29 (2018).
 "The Man in the Sci Fi Suit" in Future Visions Volume 3 (2018).
 "The Little Robot's Bedtime Prayer" in The Best of Galaxy's Edge 2015–2017 (2018).
 "The Breakout Story of Galaxy's Edge Issue Ten Million" in The Best of Galaxy's Edge 2015–2017 (2018).
 "Sympathy for the Metal" in Boundary Shock Quarterly Issue 5 (2019).
 "With Love in Their Hearts" in Fiction River: Feel the Love (2019).
 "Offensive in Every Possible Way" in Pulphouse Issue 5 (2019).
 "Monsters of Ice Cream" in Uncollected Anthology: Beasties (2019).
 "The Juggernauts of El Dorado" in Thrilling Adventure Yarns (2019).
 "Bearers of Bad, Bad News" in Boundary Shock Quarterly Issue 7 (2019).
 "The Thousandth Atlas" in Pulphouse Issue 6 (2019).
 "The Listened Heart" in Uncollected Anthology: Silver Linings (2019).
 "An Infinite Number of Idiots" in Galaxy's Edge Issue 39 (2019).
 "The Asteroid That Stays Crunchy in Milk" in Boundary Shock Quarterly Issue 8 (2019).
 "Everyone Knows Humans Have Quintuple Wiggle Sticks" in Electric Athenaeum Issue 02 (2019).
 "A Choose Your Own Fangle Adventure" in Pulphouse Issue 7 (2019).
 "Show Me Yours" in Boundary Shock Quarterly Issue 10 (2020).
 "A Maze That Is A Great White Bull" in Uncollected Anthology: Mazes and Labyrinths (2020).
 "The Realm That Didn't Suck" in Fiction River: Doorways to Enchantment (2020).
 "A Murder of Clowns" in Fiction River: Stolen (2020).
 "The Makings of a Killer" in Black Cat Mystery Magazine#7: Special Private Eye Issue (2020).
 "Christmas Newsletters from the Edge" in Joyous Christmas (2020).
 "Ollie and the Designated Bitch" in Unexpected Heroines (Cutter's Final Cut Book 1) (2020).
 "Not Sick Enough in the Head" in Obsessions (2020).
 "The 1970s Must Die!" in Space: 1975 (2021).
 "Would Sir Prefer the 1918 Influenza?" in Pulphouse Issue 10 (2021).
 "From The Journal of Traumatic Warfighter Mutation" in Boundary Shock Quarterly Issue 14 (2021).
 "The Dragon with the Girl Tattoo" in Dragons (Cutter's Final Cut Book 2) (2021).
 "Dog and Pony Show" in Clarkesworld Issue 180 (2021). 
 "Why You Should Think Twice Before Adopting an Alien Baby" in The Expanding Universe 7: An Intergalactic Adventure Anthology (2021).
 "And Miles to Go After I Sleep" in Kaleidotrope, Autumn 2021.
 "The X in Xmas" in Mystery Magazine, December 2021.
 "The Pooping Knight's Playbook" in WMG Holiday Spectacular 2021, December 2021.
 "The Christmas Haters' Ball" in WMG Holiday Spectacular 2021, December 2021.
 "Aye, Plank" in Uncollected Anthology: Paranormal Pirates (2022).
 "Pictures at a Hidden Exhibition" in Fiction River: Broken Dreams (2022).
 "The Dadaist's Tale: Start Making Sense" in The Fans Are Buried Tales (2022).
 "Chinese New Year's Resolution" in Alternative Holidays (2022).
 "Requiem for a Bird-Slinger" in Kaleidotrope, Autumn 2022.
 "A Decidedly Fly-by-Night Angel" in WMG Winter Holiday Spectacular 2022, December 2022.
 "What Happened Between Go-Days 15 and 16" in WMG Winter Holiday Spectacular 2022, December 2022.
 "Worth a Thousand Screams" in Tales from the Canyons of the Damned Issue 42, January 2023.

Comic books
 "Young Soldiers Never Die" in War, Saddle Tramp Press (2004).
 "Shit's on First" in Commercial Suicide (U.K.) (2005).
 "Redneck Neighbor" in Dead by Dawn Quarterly (2006).
 "Unstoppable" in Justice Society of America 80-Page Giant 2010, Issue 1, DC Comics (2010).
 "Gotham Eye View" in Legends of the Dark Knight, Issue 52, DC Comics (2013).
 "Ghouligan's Island" in Fractured Scary Tales, Issue 3, Scary Tales Publishing (2017).
 "Little Haunted House on the Prairie" in Fractured Scary Tales, Issue 3, Scary Tales Publishing (2017).
 "V-Kings" in Fractured Scary Tales, Issue 3, Scary Tales Publishing (2017).
 "Godzil-la-la-land" in Fractured Scary Tales, Issue 4, Scary Tales Publishing (2017).
 "Keep Calm and Apocalypse On" (flash fiction) in Captain Ginger, Issue 2, Ahoy Comics (2018).
 "The Ups and Downs of Flying" (flash fiction) in The Wrong Earth, Issue 5, Ahoy Comics (2018).
 "The Day After They Rounded Up Everyone Who Could Love Unconditionally" (flash fiction) in Edgar Allan Poe's Snifter of Terror, Issue 5, Ahoy Comics (2019).
 "The Last Night of the Last Bokey-Bokey on Earth" (flash fiction) in Planet of the Nerds, Issue 1, Ahoy Comics (2019).
 "When We Get Done With Mr. Giraffe" (flash fiction) in Hashtag: Danger, Issue 2, Ahoy Comics (2019).
 "The Vampires Strike Back" in Fractured Scary Tales, Issue 6, Scary Tales Publishing (2019).
 "Revenge of the Yeti" in Fractured Scary Tales, Issue 6 Scary Tales Publishing (2019).
 "The Heavens Have Monsters Too" in Monster Smash-Ups, Issue 2, Scary Tales Publishing (2019).
 "Black Water" in Monster Smash-Ups, Issue 2, Scary Tales Publishing (2019).
 "Reenactment" in They're Heeere!, Issue 1, Scary Tales Publishing (2019).
 "God of a Different Roach" (flash fiction) in Edgar Allan Poe's Snifter of Terror, Season Two, Issue 3, Ahoy Comics (2019).
 "Eggs of the Dog That Bit You" (flash fiction) in Edgar Allan Poe's Snifter of Terror, Season Two, Issue 4, Ahoy Comics (2020).
 "The Maleficent Seven" in Fractured Scary Tales, Issue 7, Scary Tales Publishing (2020).
 "Goodzombies" in Fractured Scary Tales, Issue 7, Scary Tales Publishing (2020).
 "The Ravenous Mrs. Mayzel" in Fractured Scary Tales, Issue 7, Scary Tales Publishing (2020).
 "Last Will and Testament of a Pop-Up Store" (flash fiction) in Billionaire Island, Issue 3, Ahoy Comics (2020).
 "Surveying Mr. Nibbles" (flash fiction) in Ash & Thorn, Issue 5, Ahoy Comics (2020).
 "Hamlet with a Bomb Instead of a Poodle" (flash fiction) in The Wrong Earth: Night and Day, Issue 3, Ahoy Comics (2021).
 "Bon-Bon" in Edgar Allan Poe's Snifter of Blood, Issue 6, Ahoy Comics (2021).
 "When the Sandwich Comes for You" (flash fiction) in Edgar Allan Poe's Snifter of Blood, Issue 6, Ahoy Comics (2021).
 "My Uninvisible Friend" (flash fiction) in Black's Myth, Issue 2, Ahoy Comics (2021).
 "Twice Upon a Footnote" (flash fiction) in Snelson: Comedy Is Dying, Issue 5, Ahoy Comics (2021).
 "Return Your Rapture to the Upright Position" (flash fiction) in G.I.L.T., Issue 2, Ahoy Comics (2022).
 "Reviews of Museum-Goers by Famous Works of Art" (flash fiction) in Justice Warriors, Issue 2, Ahoy Comics (2022).

Podcast fiction
 "Fear of Rain" in PodCastle 007 (2008).
 "Snowman's Chance in Hell" in Drabblecast 167 (2010).
 "The Love Quest of Smidgen the Snack Cake" in Escape Pod 242 (2010).
 "Dionysus Dying" in Theme and Variations Opus 2 Episode 1 (2010).
 "Something Borrowed, Something Doomed" in Drabblecast 180 (2010).
 "The Bear in the Cable-Knit Sweater" in PodCastle 141 (2011).
 "A Matter of Size" in Drabblecast 195 (2010).
 "Playing Doctor" in Escape Pod 313 (2011).
 "The Spinach Can's Son" in StarShipSofa 323 (2014).
 "In A Green Dress, Surrounded By Exploding Clowns" in StarShipSofa 506 (2017).
 "A Little Song, A Little Dance, A Little Apocalypse Down Your Pants" in StarShipSofa 529 (2018).
 "Piggyback" in Tales to Terrify 361 (2018).
 "Trick or Treat in Hell" in Tales to Terrify 405 (2019).
 "An Infinite Number of Idiots" in StarShipSofa 626 (2020).

Twitter serial
 Shave, in Thaumatrope (January 2010).

Star Trek fiction
 "Whatever You Do, Don't Read This Story" in Star Trek: Strange New Worlds Volume III,  Pocket Books (2000).  (Third Prize Winner.)
 "The Shoulders of Giants" in Star Trek: Strange New Worlds Volume V, Pocket Books (2002).
 "Our Million-Year Mission" in Star Trek: Strange New Worlds Volume VI, Pocket Books (2003).  (Grand Prize Winner.)
 "Oil and Water" in Star Trek: New Frontier: No Limits, Pocket Books (2003).
 "The Secret Heart of Zolaluz" in Star Trek: Voyager: Distant Shores, Pocket Books (2005).
 Star Trek: Starfleet Corps of Engineers: The Cleanup, E-book, Pocket Books (2006).
 Star Trek: Voyages of Imagination, Pocket Books (2006).
 "The Cleanup" in Star Trek: Corps of Engineers: Out of the Cocoon, Pocket Books (2010).

Doctor Who
 "Rock Star" in Short Trips: The Quality of Leadership, Big Finish Productions (2008).

Essays, articles, etc.
 "To Boldly Go Where No Comic Has Gone Before: Ten Of The Best Star Trek Comic Book Stories" in Amazing Heroes #181 (July 1990)
 "Here Come the Lower Deckers" in Star Trek Magazine #7 (Sept/Oct 2007)
 "Be Like House!" in House Unauthorized, Benbella Books (2007).
 "Time: The Final Frontier" in Star Trek Magazine #10 (Mar/Apr 2008)
 "Final Authority" in Star Trek Magazine #16 (Mar 2009)
 "Sympathy for the Devils" in In the Hunt: Unauthorized Essays on Supernatural, Benbella Books (2009).
 "Neelix & Kes" in Star Trek Magazine #32 (Mar 2011)
 "Fringe Double-Blinded Me With Science" in Fringe Science, Benbella Books (2011).
 "Star Trek: Enterprise Season 3" in Star Trek Magazine #37 (Oct/Nov 2011)
 "A Canvas as Big as a World" in Mars One, Humanity's Next Great Adventure, Benbella Books (2016).
 "Three Flew Over the Cuckoo's Nest" in Outside In Takes A Stab: 139 New Perspectives on 139 Buffy Stories by 139 Writers, ATB Publishing (2018)
 "Positively Biblical" in Somewhere Beyond the Heavens: Exploring Battlestar Galactica, Sequart Organization (2018)
 "Coming Attractions: Prescient Echoes of TV's Galactica Remake in Marvel's Comic Series" in Somewhere Beyond the Heavens: Exploring Battlestar Galactica, Sequart Organization (2018)
 "Jurassic Galactica: Colonials vs. Dinosaurs" in Somewhere Beyond the Heavens: Exploring Battlestar Galactica, Sequart Organization (2018)
 "Earth: Ninth Planet from the Sun - Mike Resnick Meets Galactica 1980" in Somewhere Beyond the Heavens: Exploring Battlestar Galactica, Sequart Organization (2018)
 "And Now, A Word from Our Sponsors" in Outside In Gains a Soul: 127 New Perspectives on 127 Angel and Firefly Stories by 127 Writers, ATB Publishing (2019)
 "Dirty, Dirty Hands: Touring the Underbelly of America with Azzarello" in From Bayou to Abyss: Examining John Constantine, Hellblazer, Sequart Organization (2020)
 "Hippie Freaks in Monstrous Clothing: The Addams Family vs. The Munsters" in Musings on Monsters: Observations on the World of Classic Horror, Sequart Organization (2020)
 "A Wolf in Sheep's Spacesuit: Nicholas Rush and the Dark Side of Stargate Universe" in Unauthorized Offworld Activation: Exploring the Stargate Franchise, Sequart Organization (2022)
 "Same Gate Time, Same Gate Channel: Resurrecting the Brand (Twice) with a Serial Flair" in Unauthorized Offworld Activation: Exploring the Stargate Franchise, Sequart Organization (2022)

Poetry
 "Incongruity" in American Collegiate Poets, International Publications (Fall 1984).
 "Lighthouse" in Backroads (Winter 1984).
 "Night School" in Backroads (Winter 1985).
 "Memoriam" in Backroads (Fall 1985).
 "Weight for Me(at)" in Backroads (Fall 1985).
 Flight of Ideas, (collection), Pie Press (2012).
 "I Love You More Than the Color Pink, Mirrorballface," in GUD: Greatest Uncommon Denominator Magazine (Spring 2016).
 "Murder by the Numbers," in Yellow Mama Issue 93 (2022).

E-Books
 The Greatest Serial Killer in the Universe, Pie Press (2010). 
 Fear of Rain, Pie Press (2010). 
 Rose Head, Pie Press (2010). 
 My Cannibal Lover, Pie Press (2010). 
 The First Detect-Eve, Pie Press (2010). 
 The Love Quest of Smidgen the Snack Cake, Pie Press (2010). 
 Forced Retirement, Pie Press (2010). 
 Playing Doctor, Pie Press (2010). 
 Blazing Bodices, Pie Press (2010). 
 Serial Killer vs. E-Merica, Pie Press (2010). 
 Trek This!, Pie Press (2010). 
 Trek Off!, Pie Press (2010). 
 Trek Fail!, Pie Press (2010). 
 The Dolphin Knight, Pie Press (2010). 
 The Genie's Secret, Pie Press (2010). 
 Dick by Law, Pie Press (2010). 
 Bloodliner, Pie Press (2010). 
 Groupie Everlasting, Pie Press (2010). 
 Earthshaker, Pie Press (2010). 
 The Masked Family, Pie Press (2010). 
 Dionysus Dying, Pie Press (2010). 
 Six Fantasy Stories Volume 1, Pie Press (2010). 
 Six Scifi Stories Volume 1, Pie Press (2010). 
 Six Short Stories, Pie Press (2010). 
 Lump, Pie Press (2010). 
 Death by Polka, Pie Press (2010). 
 A Matter of Size, Pie Press (2011).
 Universal Language, Pie Press (2011). 
 Diary of a Maggot, Pie Press (2011). 
 Heroes of Global Warming, Pie Press (2011).  
 Tommy Puke and the Boy with the Golden Barf, Pie Press (2011). 
 One Awake In All The World, Pie Press (2011). 
 Give the Hippo What He Wants, Pie Press (2011). 
 The Teacher of the Century, Pie Press (2011). 
 The Return of Alice, Pie Press (2011). 
 Off the Face of the Earth, Pie Press (2011). 
 Road Rage, Pie Press (2011). 
 Something Borrowed, Something Doomed, Pie Press (2011). 
 Six Scifi Stories Volume 2, Pie Press (2011). 
 Girl Meets Mind Reader, Pie Press (2011). 
 The Sword That Spoke, Pie Press (2011). 
 Six Fantasy Stories Volume 2, Pie Press (2011). 
 Day 9, Pie Press (2011). 
 Seven Comic Book Scripts Volume 1, Pie Press (2011). 
 Backtracker, (as Jason Koenig), Pie Press (2011). 
 Crimes in the Key of Murder, Pie Press (2011). 
 Who Unkilled Johnny Murder? Pie Press (2011). 
 The Foolproof Cure for Cancer, Pie Press (2011). 
 Six Scifi Stories Volume 3, Pie Press (2011). 
 The Other Waiter, Pie Press (2011). 
 Six Crime Stories Volume 1, Pie Press (2011). 
 Getting Higher, Pie Press (2011). 
 The Shrooms of Benares, Pie Press (2011). 
 Star Sex, Pie Press (2011). 
 Messiah 2.0, Pie Press (2011).
 A Grain from a Balance: A Trek Screenplay, Pie Press (2011). 
 Vendetta: A Trek Screenplay, Pie Press (2011). 
 Sticks and Stones, A Trek Novel, Pie Press (2011). 
 Trek You!, Pie Press (2011). 
 Trek It!, Pie Press (2011). 
 Tommy Puke and the World's Grossest Grown-Up, Pie Press (2011). 
 Lenin of the Stars, Pie Press (2012). 
 Forced Betrayal, Pie Press (2012).  
 Beware the Black Battlenaut, Pie Press (2012). 
 Flight of Ideas, Pie Press (2012). 
 Forced Partnership, Pie Press (2012). 
 The Wife Who Never Was, Pie Press (2012).  
 Seven Comic Book Scripts Volume 2, Pie Press (2012). 
 Six Superhero Stories, Pie Press (2012). 
 Mr. Sandman: The Dream Lord Awakens, Pie Press (2012). 
 Heaven Bent, A Novel, Pie Press (2012). 
 Snowman's Chance in Hell, Pie Press (2012). 
 The Bear in the Cable-Knit Sweater, Pie Press (2012). 
 Scifi Motherlode, Pie Press (2012). 
 Seven Comic Book Scripts Volume 3, Pie Press (2013). 
 Warning! Do Not Read This Story! Pie Press (2012). 
 Tijuana, Massachusetts, Pie Press (2013). 
 The Secret of the Ultimate Male Enhancement, Pie Press (2013). 
 A Pinstriped Finger's My Only Friend, Pie Press (2013). 
 Luminaria, Pie Press (2013). 
 The Memory of You Lingers, Pie Press (2013). 
 Undercrowd, Pie Press (2013). 
 The Slaughterers, Pie Press (2013). 
 Daddy's Little Girl, Pie Press (2013). 
 The Walking Bomb, Pie Press (2013). 
 Christmas at Glosser's, Pie Press (2013). 
 Six Scifi Stories Volume Four, Pie Press (2014). 
 The Spinach Can's Son, Pie Press (2014). 
 Cock-a-Doodle Die, Pie Press (2014). 
 Long Live Glosser's, Pie Press (2014). 
 Easter at Glosser's, Pie Press (2015). 
 Comic Book Motherlode, Pie Press (2015). 
 The Dancing Dead, Pie Press (2015). 
 The Messiah Business, Pie Press (2016). 
 Monkey Sea, Monkey Do, Pie Press (2017).

References

Bibliographies by writer
Bibliographies of American writers